Anirban Chakrabarti is an Indian Bengali film actor. Chakrabarti is known for portraying the character Ekenbabu in a web series. He also played the character Jatayu in a web series directed by Srijit Mukherji. Currently, he is portraying the role of "Ekenbabu" in the film The Eken that released in 2022.

Career 
In 2018–2021 Anirban Chakrabarti played the lead character Ekenbabu in the Eken Babu web series. His portrayal of the character received positive reception. He also acted in another web series Rabindranath Ekhane Kokhono Khete Asen Ni (2021). After the success of Ekenbabu, a film released in 2022.

Filmography

Films

Web series

Awards 
 West Bengal Film Journalists' Association Awards- Best Performance In A Negative Role for FIR

References

External links 
 

Living people
Bengali male actors
Male actors in Bengali cinema
Year of birth missing (living people)